Susan Schardt (15 January 1872 – 9 October 1934) was an Australian philanthropist who founded an organization to provide care for poverty stricken people with incurable conditions who had been discharged from hospital. Canvassing the state to raise funds, she founded the Commonwealth Home for Destitute Invalids in Ryde to offer services to a larger number of patients. The hospital, which has changed names numerous times, is still functioning as an occupational rehabilitation service provider and is now known as Royal Rehabilitation Hospital.

Early life
Susan Katherina Schardt was born on 15 January 1872 at Queanbeyan, New South Wales, Australia to Hannah (née Harris) and Frederick Schardt. Her grandfather, was Count Adam von Schardt and her father, had left Germany in search of gold in 1860. By the time of her birth, as the couple's second child, her father was engaged in farming. She and her younger brother, Charles, were born blind and together they attended the New South Wales Deaf Dumb and Blind Institution in Darlington between 1880 and 1887.

Career
A devout Methodist, during the 1890s and the Long Depression, Schardt visited patients at the Royal Prince Alfred Hospital and performed charitable works. She developed concern for people with incurable diseases or those who could not pay for care who were discharged with no help for their convalescence. When a destitute man, with a paralysis was discharged, she arranged housing and care for him and collected donations to provide on-going care from friends. Eventually a committee was formed and she began making arrangements for other patients in similar situations.

In 1900, the group rented a house in Redfern which provided care for sixteen patients with their caregivers. They called the facility the Commonwealth Home for Destitute Invalids, which later was known as the New South Wales Home for Incurables. Local notables, like Sir George Reid and Sir Thomas Anderson Stuart joined the committee board in 1902 and it continued to grow until 1906 when the building was condemned. At that time, they were responsible for having assisted fifty patients.

A public meeting was held and Sir Henry Moses offered his estate Weemala, near Ryde to the committee at half the auctioneer's value. Generous donations were made from philanthropists and Schardt and her companion Beatrice Ricketts traveled by railway, speaking to interested groups to raise money. Sufficient funds were secured and the new Home for Incurables was opened on 10 April 1907, able to accommodate sixty-five patients. Schardt's speaking engagements were authorized by the Minister of Public Instruction and until 1931, she regularly spoke to schools and at public meetings. She raised over £35,000 for the hospital and a similar facility for cancer patients.

Death and legacy
Schardt died at the institution she had founded in Ryde on 9 October 1934. Her funeral, held at St Philip's Church, was widely attended. After the service, her remains were buried in the family plot in Waverley cemetery. The facility she founded, later known as the Royal Rehabilitation Hospital, is still functioning as an occupational rehabilitation hospital in Ryde.

References

Citations

Bibliography

External links
 Royal Rehabilitation Hospital

1872 births
1934 deaths
People from Queanbeyan
Australian blind people
Australian Methodists
Australian disability rights activists
Australian people of German descent
Australian women philanthropists
Australian philanthropists
19th-century Australian women
20th-century Australian women